The 1872 Wexford Borough by-election was fought on 26 April 1872[20 3].  The election was fought due to the resignation of the incumbent MP of the Liberal Party, Richard Joseph Devereux.  It was won by the Home Rule candidate William Archer Redmond.

References

By-elections to the Parliament of the United Kingdom in County Wexford constituencies
1872 elections in the United Kingdom
1872 elections in Ireland